Destrin or DSTN (also known as actin depolymerizing factor or ADF) is a protein which in humans is encoded by the DSTN gene. Destrin is a component protein in microfilaments.

The product of this gene belongs to the actin-binding proteins ADF (Actin-Depolymerizing Factor)/cofilin family. This family of proteins is responsible for enhancing the turnover rate of actin in vivo. This gene encodes the actin depolymerizing protein that severs actin filaments (F-actin) and binds to actin monomers (G-actin). Two transcript variants encoding distinct isoforms have been identified for this gene.

Structure
The tertiary structure of destrin was determined by the use of triple-resonance multidimensional nuclear magnetic resonance, NMR.  The secondary and tertiary structures of destrin are similar to the gelsolin family which is another actin-regulating protein family.

There are three ordered layers to destrin which is a globular protein.  There is a central β sheet that is composed of one parallel strand and three antiparallel strands.  This β sheet is between a long α helix along with a shorter one and two shorter helices on the opposite side.  The four helices are parallel to the β strands.

Function
In a variety of eukaryotes, destrin regulates actin in the cytoskeleton.  Destrin binds actin and is thought to connect it as gelsolin segment-1 does.  Furthermore, the binding of actin by destrin and cofilin is regulated negatively by phosphorylation.  Destrin can also sever actin filaments.

References

External links
 
  Ramachandran Plot for destrin: